Sébastien Bouchard  is a Canadian Army brigadier-general who serves as Commandant of the Royal Military College of Canada (RMC). He served previously as Commanding Officer of the Second Canadian Division Support Group in Montreal, as Deputy Chief of Staff (Strategic) at the Canadian Joint Operations Command, and as the Commanding Officer for National Support Element (NSE) for OP ATHENA

Career and education 
Bouchard graduated from the Royal Military College of Canada with a bachelor's degree in mechanical engineering, and would later obtain his master's degree in defense studies from the Canadian Forces College.

Bouchard served as Commandant of RMC during the COVID-19 Pandemic and made the decision to send most officer cadets to learn from home during the duration of the pandemic.

On February 9, 2021, Bouchard announced his intention to retire from the Canadian Armed Forces.

References 

Canadian generals
Year of birth missing (living people)
Living people
Canadian military personnel from Quebec